SamoaNIC is the official registrar for the .ws top level domain, owned by Samoa (formerly Western Samoa). The .ws delegation was created on 14 July 1995 by IANA according to the country's preexisting ISO 3166-1 two letter country code.

The top level domain is sponsored by the Samoan Ministry of Foreign Affairs & Trade. SamoaNIC is run by Computer Services Ltd, based in Apia.

Jurisdiction
Like all country code top level domains (ccTLDs), .ws does not fall under ICANN's remit; ICANN are only responsible for commercial and generic TLDs (com, net etc.)

References

External links
Official Website

Communications in Samoa
Domain name registrars
Internet properties established in 1995